Godberg Barry Cooper (born 20 August 1997) is an Italian professional footballer who currently plays as a forward for the Romanian club Chindia Târgoviște.

Honours 
Makedonija Gjorče Petrov
Macedonian Football Cup: 2021–22

References

1997 births
Living people
Footballers from Bergamo
Italian footballers
Ghanaian footballers
Italian people of Ghanaian descent
Italian sportspeople of African descent
Italian expatriate footballers
Association football forwards
Kategoria Superiore players
Swiss Challenge League players
Macedonian First Football League players
F.C. Arouca players
S.C. Espinho players
SC Vianense players
FC Schaffhausen players
FK Kukësi players
FK Makedonija Gjorče Petrov players
Liga I players
AFC Chindia Târgoviște players
Italian expatriate sportspeople in Switzerland
Italian expatriate sportspeople in Albania
Italian expatriate sportspeople in Romania
Italian expatriates in Albania
Italian expatriates in Romania
Italian expatriate sportspeople in Portugal